The 2007 Big Ten men's basketball tournament was played between March 8 and March 11, 2007 at the United Center in Chicago, Illinois. It was the tenth annual Big Ten men's basketball tournament. The championship was won by Ohio State who defeated Wisconsin in the championship game. As a result, Ohio State received the Big Ten's automatic bid to the NCAA tournament. The win marked Ohio State's second tournament championship (the prior championship has been vacated) in their fourth appearance.

Seeds
All Big Ten schools played in the tournament. Teams were seeded by conference record, with a tiebreaker system used to seed teams with identical conference records. Seeding for the tournament was determined at the close of the regular conference season. The top five teams received a first round bye.

Bracket

All-Tournament Team
 Greg Oden, Ohio State – Big Ten tournament Most Outstanding Player
 Mike Conley, Jr., Ohio State
 Carl Landry, Purdue
 Kammron Taylor, Wisconsin
 Alando Tucker, Wisconsin

References

External links
Tournament website

Big Ten men's basketball tournament
Tournament
Big Ten Conference men's basketball tournament
Big Ten men's basketball tournament